Silent Scream(s) may refer to:

Film
Silent Scream (1979 film), a horror film released in 1979 and 1980, also known simply as Silent Scream
Silent Scream (1990 film), a biographical film about murderer Larry Winters
Silent Scream, a 1999 horror film starring Dana Plato
Silent Scream (2005 film), a horror film
The Silent Scream, a 1984 anti-abortion film

Music
Silent Screams, a British metalcore band
Silent Scream, former name of Malaysian rock band Paperplane Pursuit
"Silent Screams", a 2008 album by Éowyn
Silent Scr3am, a 2009 album by Elysion
Silent Scream, Japanese version of Brutal album by Dr. Sin
"Silent Scream", a 1988 song on the album South of Heaven by Slayer
"Silent Screams", a 2000 song on the album Resurrection by Halford
"Silent Scream", a Richard Marx song from his 1994 album Paid Vacation
 Silent Scream (album), a 1985 album by the group Shooting Star

Literature
Silent Scream, a 2009 novel by Lynda La Plante
Silent Scream, a 2015 novel by Angela Marsons
 The Silent Scream, a 1993 novel and the first of the Nightmare Hall series by Diane Hoh

See also
Silent Stream of Godless Elegy, Moravian folk metal band